Death Drums Along the River (titled Sanders in the USA) is a 1963 British-German international co-production, using the characters from Edgar Wallace's 1911 novel Sanders of the River and  Zoltán Korda's 1935 film based on the novel, but placed in a totally different story. Filmed on location in South Africa, it features Richard Todd and Marianne Koch leading a cast of British, German and South African actors. The film was the first feature film of British producer Harry Alan Towers.

Plot
In an unnamed small British colony on the west coast of Africa, somewhat resembling the Gambia, and according to the dialogue next to Senegal, two policemen patrolling a wharf sight a sack of peanuts dropped by stevedores. As the sack breaks the workers discover a pouch in it that is quickly grabbed by a man who then runs away. The policemen chase him and he eventually kills one of them before disappearing. Police Commissioner Sanders (Todd) questions Pearson (Bill Brewer), a suspected criminal, but finds no information.

At the same time a Dr Jung (Koch) arrives at the airport and is met by Todd's assistant, Inspector Hamilton (Jeremy Lloyd). Hamilton is pleasantly surprised that Dr Jung is both female and pretty. Dr Jung is going to see Dr Schneider who runs a clinic up-river, close to the colony's eastern border. Also on the plane with her is an American journalist (Robert Arden) who wishes to visit the clinic to do a story and turns out to be an old friend of Pearson.

Commissioner Sanders begins to suspect that the clinic is a location for diamonds being smuggled across the border. He asks what distant drumming means and is told that they signal a funeral. He interrupts this native burial ceremony as he wishes to identify the body. They are allegedly burying the murderer from the first scene. Sanders doesn't believe this, but just as he finds the murderer and arrests him, a shot fires out, and truly kills him.

Meanwhile it is revealed that Dr Schneider, who is very ill, is receiving a 10% dose of the drug he needs instead of 100%. He is aware of the diamonds on his land but wants to give it back to the natives when he dies. Ultimately it is his assistant Dr Weiss who is revealed as the smuggler.

Main cast
 Richard Todd as Commissioner Harry Sanders
 Marianne Koch as Dr Inge Jung
 Albert Lieven as Dr Weiss
 Walter Rilla as Dr Schneider
 Jeremy Lloyd as Hamilton
 Robert Arden as Hunter
 Vivi Bach as Marlene
 Bill Brewer as Pearson
 Simon Sabela as Bosambo

Sequel
Todd reprised the role of Harry Sanders in 'Coast of Skeletons (1965).

Production
Harry Alan Towers produced several films in South Africa with financing from Constantin Film in West Germany  and casts of actors from that country.

The film was marketed in West Germany as one of the then popular series of Edgar Wallace films, but it has very little to do with Wallace's novel Sanders of the River, or the previous films based on it, apart from the name Sanders and the boat Zaire, though here it is a small motorboat rather than a steamer. The intertribal warfare in Wallace's work has been replaced by a standard detective story involving murder and diamond-smuggling.

The fictional colony is not given a name, but in the spirit of the times Dr Jung asks Sanders what he will do when it is granted independence and Sanders replies that he will stay on "if they'll have me".

Richard Todd had been in Africa filming The Hellions and was attempting to produce a film of Ian Fleming's The Diamond Smugglers''.

Locations
The film was shot in Durban, Durban North, Zululand and Lake St Lucia.

Notes

External links
 

1963 films
1960s adventure drama films
British adventure drama films
German adventure drama films
West German films
1960s English-language films
English-language German films
English-language South African films
Films set in Africa
Films shot in South Africa
Films based on works by Edgar Wallace
Films based on British novels
South African adventure drama films
Constantin Film films
1963 drama films
1960s British films
1960s German films